Saniya Iyappan (born 20 April 2002) an Indian actress who works in Malayalam films and television shows. She is best known for her roles in the films Queen (2018) and Lucifer (2019).

Career
Saniya started her career in television, as a contestant in the dance reality show D2 - D 4 Dance on Mazhavil Manorama. She emerged as the second runner-up of the show.

Saniya made her film acting debut with Baalyakaalasakhi in 2014, portraying the childhood of Isha Talwar. She also acted in Apothecary in the same year, as the daughter of Suresh Gopi. After playing brief roles in various films, Saniya played her first lead role in the 2018 film Queen. Her performance earned her several accolades including the Filmfare Award for Best Female Debut - South. She next starred in Prithviraj Sukumaran's directorial debut Lucifer.  Then she starred in Mammootty starred film The Priest in a cameo. She next played the lead role in a rape and revenge horror thriller film titled Krishnankutty Pani Thudangi, opposing Vishnu Unnikrishnan, where her performance was critically acclaimed.

Filmography

Films
All films are in Malayalam language unless otherwise noted.

Television

Web series

Music videos

Short films

Awards

References

External links
 

Living people
Indian film actresses
Actresses in Malayalam cinema
21st-century Indian actresses
1996 births
Child actresses in Malayalam cinema